The women's 100 metres hurdles event at the 2002 African Championships in Athletics was held in Radès, Tunisia on August 9–10.

Medalists

Results

Heats
Wind:Heat 1: +0.7 m/s, Heat 2: 0.0  m/s

Final
Wind: +2.5 m/s

References

2002 African Championships in Athletics
Sprint hurdles at the African Championships in Athletics
2002 in women's athletics